Busintsi is a village in Tran Municipality, Pernik Province in western Bulgaria. It is famous for its pottery. 

The village is located at 750 meters above sea level. Its population is 60 persons.

Villages in Pernik Province